Will Johnson (born March 29, 2003) is an American football cornerback for the Michigan Wolverines. He was the No. 1 recruit in Michigan for the 2022 recruiting class. He is the son of former Michigan defensive back Deon Johnson.

Early years and high school career
Johnson was born in 2003 and grew up in Detroit. His father, Deon Johnson, was a defensive back for Michigan in the 1990s.

Johnson played high school football at Grosse Pointe South High School. As a senior, he had 45 tackles, including 31 solo tackles, and 12 pass breakups. He was rated as the No. 1 player in Michigan by 247Sports, ESPN, and Rivals.com.

C0llege career
In February 2021, Johnson committed to Michigan's 2022 recruiting class. He also had offers from, among others, Ohio State, USC, Oklahoma, and Texas A&M. He was one of the first Michigan recruits to benefit from new rule allowing players to be compensated for use of their name and likeness.

He enrolled early at Michigan in January 2022 and participated in winter conditioning. He impressed in spring practice and was described as being position to play early in the fall of 2022. He became a starter as a true freshman, and at the end of the season, he was named to Pro Football Focus's PFF True Freshman All-America team.

References

External links
 Michigan Wolverines bio

2003 births
Living people
American football cornerbacks
Michigan Wolverines football players
Players of American football from Michigan